George Edward Hunt (30 September 1896 – 22 January 1959) was an English cricketer who played over 200 matches for Somerset County Cricket Club as a bowling all-rounder. He scored nearly 5,000 first-class runs including one century and fifteen half-centuries, and took 386 wickets at a bowling average of 32.87 through a ten-year career from 1921 to 1931.

Hunt was a lower-order right-handed batsman and a right-arm medium-pace bowler often used as first-change. He was also a regular close-to-the-wicket fielder.

References

English cricketers
Somerset cricketers
Cricketers from Somerset
1896 births
1959 deaths